"Virus" is a KMFDM song from their fifth album, Naïve. In 2008, KMFDM Records re-released this as a 7" vinyl single, limited to 250 copies.

Reception
The original four track EP was called "easily their strongest" in 1996.  AllMusic's Johnny Loftus described the title track as "innocent new wave gone very naughty in a PVC hell." Eric Olsen called the song one of industrial's best, with the same "razor-sharp guitars, hummable tune, clever lyrics, and danceable beat in the funky-to-brutal range" as many of the band's other songs.

Track listing

References

External links 
 

1989 singles
KMFDM songs
1989 songs
Wax Trax! Records singles
Songs written by Sascha Konietzko
Songs written by Günter Schulz
Songs written by En Esch